Desmia funeralis, the grape leaffolder, is a moth of the family Crambidae. It is found across the southern parts of the United States to California, north to the northeastern states and southeastern Canada.

The wingspan is 21–28 mm. Adults are on wing from May to September. It is a day-flying species. There are two to three generations per year.

The larvae feed on Vitis, Cercis canadensis and Oenothera. It is considered a minor pest of grapes in the United States.

External links
Bug Guide
Images
Florida Featured Creatures

Moths described in 1796
Desmia
Moths of North America